Patricia D. Horoho (née Dallas; born March 21, 1960) is a retired United States Army lieutenant general who served as the 43rd Surgeon General of the United States Army and Commanding General of the United States Army Medical Command. She was the second female Nurse Corps officer to hold the title of Army surgeon general but the first to be appointed and hold the position for a full term. In 2016, she was inducted into the United States Army Women's Foundation Hall of Fame.

Early life and education
Horoho was born in Fort Bragg on March 21, 1960, and attended St. Ann Catholic School and St. Patrick Catholic School in Fayetteville, North Carolina. She graduated from E.E. Smith High School in 1978. She earned her Bachelor of Science in Nursing from the University of North Carolina at Chapel Hill in 1982 and the Master of Science as a Clinical Trauma Nurse Specialist from the University of Pittsburgh in 1992.

Military career

In 1994, Horoho was the head nurse of the emergency room at Womack Army Medical Center. She treated the wounded in the aftermath of the Green Ramp disaster.

Horoho was recognized as a Nurse Hero by the American Red Cross on September 14, 2002, for her actions during the September 11 attacks, during which she raced "from her desk" to give first-aid to 75 victims. Among her military awards are the Army Distinguished Service Medal, the Order of Military Medical Merit medallion, Legion of Merit with two oak leaf clusters, Meritorious Service Medal with 6 oak leaf clusters, Army Commendation Medal with three oak leaf clusters, and the Army Achievement Medal with one oak leaf cluster. She was also recognized as a Legacy Laureate by the University of Pittsburgh in 2007.

Horoho has served as commander of:
 DeWitt Army Community Hospital in Fort Belvoir, Virginia (2004–2006),
 Walter Reed Health Care System in Washington D.C. (2007–2008),
 Madigan Army Medical Center in Tacoma, Washington (2008–2009),
 Western Regional Medical Command, based in Fort Lewis, Washington (2008–2010), and
 United States Army Medical Command, as Surgeon General of the United States Army (December 2011 – December 3, 2015).

Horoho was succeeded by Lieutenant General Nadja West on 11 December 2015. Horoho retired from the Army on 1 February 2016.

Awards and recognitions

Personal life
Horoho is the daughter of retired army officer Frank Dallas and Josephine Dallas. She is married to retired Colonel Ray Horoho, and they have two children. She has one brother, Ed Dallas, and one sister, Nancy Dallas (now Boatner). She received an honorary degree from New York Institute of Technology.

References

External links

https://health.mil/News/Articles/2016/09/12/Medical-Response-to-9-11-Patricia-Horoho-and-Malcolm-Nance – description of actions on September 11.

People from Fayetteville, North Carolina
University of North Carolina at Chapel Hill alumni
University of Pittsburgh alumni
Surgeons General of the United States Army
Female generals of the United States Army
1960 births
Living people
American nurses
American women nurses
Recipients of the Legion of Merit
Recipients of the Distinguished Service Medal (US Army)
People from Fort Bragg, North Carolina
Recipients of the Meritorious Service Medal (United States)
21st-century American women